In the 2010–11 season, Partizan Belgrade competed in the Basketball League of Serbia, the Radivoj Korać Cup, the Adriatic League and the Euroleague.

Players

Current roster

Depth chart

Roster changes
In
  Curtis Jerrells (from  Austin Toros)
  Jaka Klobučar (from  Union Olimpija)
  Nemanja Jaramaz (from  Mega Vizura)
  Raško Katić (from  Hemofarm)
  James Gist (from  Lokomotiv Kuban)
  Nathan Jawai (from  Minnesota Timberwolves)
  Dragan Milosavljević (from  Radnički Kragujevac)
  Bogdan Bogdanović (from youth categories)
  Oliver Lafayette (from  Boston Celtics)

Out
  Bo McCalebb (to  Montepaschi Siena)
  Lawrence Roberts (to  Efes Pilsen)
  Aleks Marić (to  Panathinaikos)
  Stefan Sinovec (to  Metalac Valjevo)
  Sava Lešić (to  Crvena zvezda)
  Strahinja Milošević (to  Crvena zvezda)
  Aleksandar Rašić (to  Trabzonspor)
  Darko Balaban (to  Crvena zvezda)
  Slavko Vraneš (to  UNICS Kazan)
  Oliver Lafayette (from  Fort Wayne Mad Ants)

Preseason and friendlies

2010 Gomelsky Cup

Competitions

Adriatic League

Standings

Regular season

Final four

Semifinals

Final

Euroleague

Regular season

Group B

Top 16

Individual awards
Adriatic League

ABA League Finals MVP
 Nathan Jawai 

Radivoj Korać Cup

Finals MVP
 James Gist

Basketball League of Serbia

Finals MVP
 Curtis Jerrells

References

External links
 Official website 

KK Partizan seasons
Partizan
Partizan